"Work to Do" is a 1972 funk song by the Isley Brothers, released on their T-Neck imprint. The song, written and produced by the group, was issued on their 1972 album, Brother, Brother, Brother, and charted at #51 pop and #11 R&B upon its initial charting. 

Lyrically, the song explicates a troubled situation between a man and his girlfriend/wife, concerning the lack of quality time spent with each other. The man pleads that as much as he cannot wait to get home and spend time with her, he has a more pressing obligation/commitment to attend to work.

Charts

Weekly charts
{| class="wikitable sortable plainrowheaders"
|-
!scope="col"|Chart (1972)
!scope="col"|Peakposition
|-
!scope="row"|US Billboard Hot 100
|align="center"|51
|-
!scope="row"|US Hot R&B/Hip-Hop Songs (Billboard)|align="center"|11
|}

Credits
Lead vocals – Ronald Isley
Backing vocals – O'Kelly Isley, Jr., Rudolph Isley
Percussion, guitars – Ernie Isley
Bass, percussion – Marvin Isley
Piano, keyboards – Chris Jasper
Drums – George Moreland
Congas – Karl Potter

Vanessa Williams version

Vanessa Williams recorded the song for her 1991 album The Comfort Zone. In 1992, her version became a Top 5 US Billboard R&B hit at No. 3 and Top 10 US Billboard Dance hit at No. 8. It was her fifth and final single from the album.

Track listings
US CD maxi-single
 "Work to Do" (Radio Mix w/Rap) – 3:54
 "Work to Do" (Super Dope Remix w/Rap) – 4:52
 "Work to Do" (Ken Lou Radio Mix)" – 3:07
 "Work to Do" (Choice Club) – 6:02
 "Work to Do" (Choice Dub) – 2:30
 "Work to Do" (5-Oh Beats w/Rap) – 2:53

UK CD maxi-single
 "Work to Do" (7" Mix) – 3:54
 "Work to Do" (Ken Lou 7" Mix With Rap) – 3:54
 "Work to Do" (Choice Club)" – 6:02

Remixed by Kenny "Dope" Gonzales and "Little" Louie Vega

Charts
Weekly charts

Credits
Lead vocals – Vanessa Williams
Guitar – Ira Siege
Backing Vocals – Táta Vega
Rap vocals – Dres
Piano – Jorgen Kaufma
Producer – Dr. Jam, Gerry Brown, Phase 5
Remix producer – Kenny "Dope" Gonzalez, "Little" Louie Vega

Other cover versions
 Average White Band in 1974 from their album AWB'', the single peaked to No.  10 on US Billboard's Disco chart.

References

1972 singles
1992 singles
The Isley Brothers songs
1972 songs
T-Neck Records singles
Vanessa Williams songs